Pribiš is a village and municipality in Dolný Kubín District in the Zilina Region of northern Slovakia.

History
In historical records the village was first mentioned in 1567.

Geography
The municipality lies at an altitude of 644 metres and covers an area of 8.403 km2. It has a population of about 474 people.

External links
http://www.statistics.sk/mosmis/eng/run.html

Villages and municipalities in Dolný Kubín District